Forez is a former province of France, corresponding approximately to the central part of the modern Loire département and a part of the Haute-Loire and Puy-de-Dôme départements.

The final "z" in Forez is not pronounced in the Loire département; however, it is pronounced in the western part of the former province, essentially when referring to the correspondent Forez Mountains (on the border between Puy-de-Dôme and Loire. The name is derived from the city of Feurs. Franco-Provençal is the language that was historically spoken in the region.

The city of Montbrison, Loire is considered the historical capital of the Forez.

Residents of the Forez are called Foréziens.

The rue du Forez in the third arrondissement of Paris was built in the late 16th century and appears on Turgot's map of Paris.

List of counts of Forez
The origins of the county of Forez are obscure. There are several early figures who are sometimes supposed to have been counts of Forez. Whether these are considered counts or not can affect the numbering offered for the later counts.
William (I), recorded as a count in 925 in a document of the Abbey of Savigny
William (II), recorded as a count in 944 in a document of the Abbey of Cluny
Artaud (I), alleged brother of William (II), died 960
Gerard (I), alleged son of Artaud (I), died 990

The counts of Forez were also counts of Lyon in the Empire until 1173, when the countship of Lyon passed to the Archbishop of Lyon.

House of Forez
Artaud I (II) (died before 1010)
Pons (died 1011/1016), from the ruling house of Gévaudan, ruled Forez through marriage
Artaud II (III) (died c.1017)
Gerard I (II) (died after 1046)
Artaud III (IV) (died 1079)
William I (III) (1079–1097)
William II (IV) (died after 1107)
Eustace (died 1110/1117)
Guy (1107?–1115?), from the ruling house of Guînes, ruled Forez through marriage

The period between 1096 and 1115 is uncertain owing to a lack of sources.

House of Albon
Guigues I (II) (1107?–1138), son of Guiges-Raymond (sometimes numbered Guigues I) and Ide-Raymond, daughter of Artaud III
Guigues II (III) (1138–1199)
Guigues III (IV) (1199–1203)
Guigues IV (V) (1203–1241)
Guigues V (VI) (1241–1259)
Renaud (1259–1270)
Guigues VI (VII) (1270–1279)
John I (1279–1333)
Guigues VII (VIII) (1333–1358)
Louis (1358–1362)
John II (1362–1369)
Jeanne (1369–1372)
Anne (1372–1417)

House of Bourbon
John I (1417–1434)
Charles I (1434–1456)
John II (1456–1488)
Charles II (1488)
Peter (1488–1503)
Suzanne (1505–1521)
Charles III (1505–1521), count by marriage

House of Savoy
Louise (1521–1531)

United to the French crown in 1531.

Appanage
Henry (1566–1574), future King Henry III

United to the French crown permanently in 1574.

References
 Aug. Bernard jeune, Histoire du Forez, Bernard ainé impr., Montbrison, 1835.

 
Former provinces of France
Geography of Loire (department)
Geography of Haute-Loire
History of Auvergne-Rhône-Alpes